Piroska Budai (born 18 May 1955 in Egyek) is a former Hungarian handball player who competed in the 1980 Summer Olympics.

In 1980 she was a member of the Hungarian team which finished fourth. She played four matches and scored two goals.

References

1955 births
Living people
People from Egyek
Hungarian female handball players
Olympic handball players of Hungary
Handball players at the 1980 Summer Olympics
Sportspeople from Hajdú-Bihar County